Gregory Butler (born 31 December 2000) is an English international swimmer. He has represented England at the Commonwealth Games.

Biography
Butler first competed at National Age group level in 2013 as a 12 year old reaching the 100m & 200m Breaststroke finals whilst representing Newcastle Staffs ASC.
In the autumn of 2013 he moved to City of Derby SC & in 2014 at the British Swimming Summer Championships, he won the 200m Breaststroke breaking the British 13 year old age group record in a time of 2 mins:25.86 ( this is still the England Age Group record).
In 2016, Butler became the fastest-ever British 14-year-old breaststroke swimmer over 100m and 200m and fastest-ever 17-year-old British swimmer in the 200-metre discipline. He won two bronze medals at the 2022 British Swimming Championships in the 100 & 200 metres breaststroke.

In 2022, he was selected for the 2022 Commonwealth Games in Birmingham where he competed in five events; the men's 50 metres breaststroke, reaching the final and finishing in 7th place, the men's 100 metre breaststroke finishing in 11th place and the men's 200 metre breaststroke, reaching the final and finishing in 5th place. He was also part of the team that won the bronze medal in the 4×100 m mixed medley & the gold medal in the Men’s 4 x 100 metre medley relay

References

2000 births
Living people
English male swimmers
British male swimmers
Swimmers at the 2022 Commonwealth Games
Commonwealth Games medallists in swimming
Commonwealth Games gold medallists for England
Commonwealth Games bronze medallists for England
21st-century English people
European Aquatics Championships medalists in swimming
Medallists at the 2022 Commonwealth Games